The 1996 Canadian National Soccer League season was the seventy-fourth season for the Canadian National Soccer League. The season began on May 31, 1996, and concluded on October 27, 1996, with Toronto Italia defeating St. Catharines Wolves in a two-game series for the CNSL Championship. St. Catharines managed to secure their fourth league cup title after finishing first in the tournament standings.

Overview  
The membership in the league increased to seven teams with three new entries. The league expanded to the Oakville territory with the addition of the Oakville Canadian Westerns, and the acceptance of Toronto Supra from the Canadian International Soccer League (Puma League). While the North York Talons represented the Caribbean Community in the Greater Toronto Area. The Hamilton White Eagles departed to join the Canadian International Soccer League, and the Toronto Jets merged with Toronto Italia.

Toronto Italia under new ownership transferred their home venue to Rainbow Creek Stadium in Woodbridge, Vaughan. Italia also managed to recruit Diego Maradona for the CNSL All-Star match. In the league's executive branch Peter Li Preti served as president, and Michael Di Biase as commissioner.

Teams

Final standings

Playoffs

Semifinals

Finals

Toronto won 11–0 on aggregate.

Cup   
The cup tournament was a separate contest from the rest of the season, in which all seven teams took part. All the matches were separate from the regular season. Teams played each other once home and away in the Cup competition, and the first-place team would win the Cup competition. One match involving Toronto Italia and London City failed to materialize, but was of no consequence as St. Catharines Wolves accumulated enough points to secure the title.

Standings

Matches

All-Star game  
The all-star team assembled by the league was limited in its selection of players due to St. Catharines, and Oakville protesting the allowance of their players. As St. Catharines earlier on participated in a European tour, and their players required the necessary rest. Toronto Italia were selected as the opposition, and managed to attract Diego Maradona to play alongside his brother Lalo Maradona. The match was commemorated as the 75th anniversary of the league, and advertised as one of Diego Maradona's final matches. The reported payoff to Maradona was $40,000 with Boca Juniors receiving a share due to ownership of player rights. An additional $15,000 was charged if reporters wished to conduct an interview, and the league insured Maradona for five million dollars.

Individual awards   
The annual Canadian National Soccer League awards ceremony was held at the Hollywood Princess Banquet Hall in Vaughan, Ontario with an attendance of 400 people. The majority of the awards were received by Toronto Italia with eight recipients. After leading Toronto to an undefeated streak, the double head coach Peter Pinizzotto was given the honor of Coach of the Year. Michele Gioia was named both the MVP, a Golden Boot winner consequently the following season he was signed by the Montreal Impact in the USISL A-League. For the second consecutive season Joe Ciaravino received the Goalkeeper of the Year, and also later was given a contract with the Toronto Lynx. The administrative branch of Toronto Italia was recognized with honors with Joe Mallozzi winning the Manager of the Year, and Pasquale Fioccola being awarded the President of the Year.

Toronto Supra came in second with two awards with Gus Kouzmanis being named the Rookie of the Year. The Best Public Relations Director award was given to Sergio Giancola, who notably later was instrumental in acquiring a Major Arena Soccer League franchise in the GTA as the Mississauga MetroStars. The remainder of the awards went to North York Talons as the Most Improved, and London City as the Most Disciplined team. The Referee of the Year went to match official Manuel Orellana.

References

External links
RSSSF - 1996 CNSL page
thecnsl.com - 1996 season

1996 domestic association football leagues
1996 in Canadian soccer
1996